The German Bundesrat (lit. Federal Council) is a legislative body that represents the sixteen Länder (federated states) of Germany at the federal level (German: Bundesebene). The Bundesrat meets at the former Prussian House of Lords in Berlin. Its second seat is located in the former West German capital of Bonn.

The Bundesrat participates in legislation, alongside the Bundestag consisting of directly elected representatives of the German people. Laws that affect state powers, and all constitutional changes, need the consent of both houses. For its somewhat similar function, the Bundesrat is sometimes (controversially) described as an upper house of parliament along the lines of the United States Senate, the Canadian Senate, and the British House of Lords.

Bundesrat was the name of similar bodies in the North German Confederation (1867) and the German Empire (1871). Its predecessor in the Weimar Republic (1919–1933) was the Reichsrat.

The political makeup of the Bundesrat is affected by changes in power in the states of Germany, and thus by elections in each state. Each state delegation in the Bundesrat is essentially a representation of the state government and reflects the political makeup of the ruling majority or plurality of each state legislature (including coalitions). Thus the Bundesrat is a continuous body and has no legislative periods. For organizational reasons, the Bundesrat structures its legislative calendar in years of business (Geschäftsjahre), beginning each year on 1 November. Each year of business is congruous with the one-year-term of the presidium. The sessions have been counted continuously since the first session on 7 September 1949. The Bundesrat's 1000th session, which was opened by a speech held by President of Germany Frank-Walter Steinmeier, took place on 12 February 2021.

History

German Confederation 
The historical predecessor of the Bundesrat was the Federal Convention (Confederate Diet) of the German Confederation (1815–1848, 1850/1851–1866). That Federal Convention consisted of the representatives of the member states. The first basic law (Bundesakte) of the German Confederation listed how many votes a member state had, for two different formations of the diet. The diet was the only organ – there was no division of powers. The diet was chaired by the Austrian representative.

In the revolution of 1848 the Bundestag transferred its powers to the Imperial Regent and was reactivated only in 1850/1851. Several other attempts to reform the Confederation involved retaining the Bundestag and adding a parliament and a court. One of these attempts, the proposed Reform Act of 1863, had introduced the term Bundesrath. With the dissolution of the Confederation in August 1866, the diet and the federal law ended.

Bundesrat 1867–1918 

On July 1, 1867, the North German Confederation was established as a confederal state. The Reichstag, elected by the North German men, was one legislative body. The other one was the Bundesrath (old spelling). This organ was expressly modelled after the old diet. When the Confederation was transformed and renamed Deutsches Reich (German Empire) in 1871, the Bundesrat kept its name.

Whilst appointed by state governments just as today, the delegates of the original Bundesrat—as those of the Reichsrat—were usually high-ranking civil servants, not cabinet members. The original Bundesrat was very powerful; every bill needed its consent, equaling it to the popularly elected Reichstag. It could also, with the Emperor's agreement, dissolve the Reichstag.

Weimar Republic 
In the revolution of 1918, the revolutionary organ  ("Council of People's Representatives") limited the power of the Bundesrat to its administrative functions. A  (committee of states) accompanied the reform of Germany but had no official role in installing the new constitution.

So, in most cases, bills vetoed by the  failed due to the lack of unity among the 's constituent parties. The  was abolished by a National Socialist law in 1934, roughly a year after Hitler had come to power.

Seat 

From 1894 to 1933, the Bundesrat/Reichsrat met in the same building as the Reichstag, today known as Reichstagsgebäude. After 1949, the Bundesrat gathered in the Bundeshaus in Bonn, along with the Bundestag, at least most of the time. A wing of the Bundeshaus was specially built for the Bundesrat.

In 2000, the Bundesrat moved to Berlin, as the Bundestag had done the year before. The Berlin seat of the Bundesrat is the former Prussian House of Lords building. The Bundesrat wing in Bonn is still used as a second seat.

Composition

Historically 
For the Federal Diet of 1815, the basic law (Bundesakte) established two different formations. In the Plenary, for the most important decisions, every state had at least one vote. The larger states Austria, Prussia, Bavaria, Saxony, Hannover and Württemberg had each four votes, and the lesser states three or two. Of the 39 states, 25 had only one vote.

The North German Confederation was an entity different from the German Confederation. But it can also be regarded as the brain child of a long lasting reform debate within the German Confederation. The new Bundesrat even referred to the old diet in art. 6, when it newly distributed the votes for the single states. Prussia with its original four votes received additionally the votes of the states it had annexed in 1866, i.e. Hanover, Hesse-Kassel, Holstein, Nassau and Frankfurt, adding up to 17 votes. The total number of votes in 1867 was 43 votes.

When the South German states joined in 1870/71, the revised federal constitutions allocated new votes for them. Bavaria had 6 votes, Württemberg 4, Baden 3 and (the whole of) Hesse-Darmstadt 3. The total number went up to 58 votes, and in 1911 with the three votes for Alsace-Lorraine to 61 votes. The Prussian votes remained 17.

To put the Prussian votes in context: 80% of the North Germans lived in Prussia, and after 1871, Prussia made up two thirds of the German population and territory. Prussia was always underrepresented in the Bundesrat.

Weimar Republic 
The Reichsrat, as a first, had no fixed numbers of votes for the member states. Instead, it introduced the principle that the number depended on the actual number of inhabitants. Originally, for every 1 million of inhabitants the state had one vote. In 1921, this was reduced to 700,000.

No state was allowed to have more than 40 percent of the votes. This was regarded as a clausula antiborussica, counterbalancing the dominant position of Prussia which still provided roughly two thirds of the German population. Also since 1921, half of the Prussian votes were not cast by the Prussian state government but by the administrations of the Prussian provinces.

For example, of the 63 votes in 1919, Prussia had 25 votes, Bavaria seven and Saxony five. 12 states had only 1 vote each.

Today 
The composition of the Bundesrat is different from other similar legislative bodies representing states (such as the Russian Federation Council or the U.S. Senate). Bundesrat members are not elected—either by popular vote or by the state parliaments—but are delegated by the respective state government. They do not enjoy a free mandate (for example, most parliamentary privileges in the Bundesrat can be exercised only by a Land, not an individual member) and serve only as long as they are representing their state, not for a fixed period of time. Members of the Bundesrat (suffix "MdBR") do however enjoy the same immunity from prosecution that Members of the German Bundestag have. In addition, Members of the Bundesrat have unlimited access to sessions of the Bundestag (where they have their own benches to the left of the President of the Bundestag) and its committees and can address it at any time. The latter right was most famously used in 2002 by then-Hamburg Senator Ronald Schill, who gave an inflammatory speech that was widely denounced.

Normally, a state delegation consists of the Minister President (called Governing Mayor in Berlin, President of the Senate in Bremen and First Mayor in Hamburg) and other cabinet ministers (called senators in Berlin, Bremen and Hamburg). The state cabinet may appoint as many delegates as the state has votes and they usually do (all other ministers/senators are usually appointed as deputy delegates), but may also send just a single delegate to exercise all of the state's votes. In any case, the state has to cast its votes en bloc, i.e., without vote splitting. If Members of the Bundesrat from the same state vote differently, the entire votes of the state are counted as abstention. A famous example of when this happened was in 2002, when in a very close vote on a new immigration law by the Schröder government then-Deputy Minister-President of Brandenburg Jörg Schönbohm (CDU) cast a no vote and then-State Minister Alwin Ziel (SPD) cast a yes vote. As state elections are not coordinated across Germany and can occur at any time, the majority distributions in the Bundesrat can change after any such election.

The number of votes a state is allocated is based on a form of degressive proportionality according to its population. This way, smaller states have more votes than a distribution proportional to the population would grant. The presence of the small city-states of Bremen, Hamburg, and Berlin prevents the Bundesrat from having the rural and conservative bias of other similar legislative bodies with small state bias. The allocation of votes is regulated by the German constitution (Grundgesetz). All of a state's votes are cast en bloc—either for or against or in abstention of a proposal. Each state is allocated at least three votes, and a maximum of six. States with more than
 2 million inhabitants have 4 votes,
 6 million inhabitants have 5 votes,
 7 million inhabitants have 6 votes.

By convention, SPD-led Länder are summarized as A-Länder, while those with governments led by CDU or CSU are called B-Länder.

Voting 

In contrast to many other legislative bodies, the delegates to the Bundesrat from any one state are required to cast the votes of the state as a single bloc (since the votes are not those of the respective delegate). The delegates are not independent members of the Bundesrat but instructed representatives of the federated states' governments. If the members of a delegation cast different votes then the entire vote of the respective state is invalid. This tradition stems from the 1867 Bundesrat.

The delegates of a state are equal to each other in the Bundesrat, hence the minister president has no special rights compared to his ministers. But it is possible (and even customary) that one of the delegates (the Stimmführer, "leader of the votes"—normally the minister president) casts all votes of the respective state, even if the other members of the delegation are present.

Because coalition governments are common, states frequently choose to abstain if their coalition cannot agree on a position. As every decision of the Bundesrat requires a majority of the fixed allocated votes (i.e., majority of 69 = 35 votes in favour), not just a majority of votes cast or a majority of delegates present, abstaining has the same effect as voting against a proposal.

Between 1949 and 1990, West Berlin was represented by four members, elected by its Senate, but owing to the city's ambiguous legal status, they did not have voting rights.

Presidency 

Originally from 1867 to 1918, the Bundesrat was chaired by the chancellor, although he was not a member and had no vote. This tradition was kept to a degree when since 1919 the Reichsrat still had to be chaired by a member of the imperial government (often the minister of the interior).

Since 1949, the presidency rotates annually among the Ministers President of each of the states. This is fixed by the Königsteiner Abkommen, starting with the federated state with the largest population going down. On the other hand, the office of the vice-president started with the federated state with the smallest population going up. The President of the Bundesrat convenes and chairs plenary sessions of the body and is formally responsible for representing Germany in matters of the Bundesrat. The president is aided by two Vice Presidents who play an advisory role and deputise in the president's absence; the predecessor of the current President is first, his successor second Vice President. The three together make up the Bundesrat's executive committee.

The President of the Bundesrat ("Bundesratspräsident"), is fourth in the order of precedence after the Federal President, the President of the Bundestag (No 2 just for ceremonies of interior character – otherwise No 3)., the Chancellor (No. 2 for ceremonies of exterior character) and before the President of the Federal Constitutional Court. The President of the Bundesrat becomes acting Federal President of Germany, in case that the office of the Federal President should be vacant.

Organizational structure

Because the Bundesrat is so much smaller than the Bundestag, it does not require the extensive organizational structure of the Bundestag. The Bundesrat typically schedules plenary sessions once a month for the purpose of voting on legislation prepared in committee. In comparison, the Bundestag conducts about fifty plenary sessions a year.

The voting Bundesrat delegates themselves rarely attend committee sessions; instead, they delegate that responsibility to civil servants from their ministries, as allowed for in the Basic Law (art. 52,2). The delegates themselves tend to spend most of their time in their state capitals, rather than in the federal capital. The delegations are supported by the Landesvertretungen, which function basically as embassies of the states in the federal capital.

Tasks 

The legislative authority of the Bundesrat is subordinate to that of the Bundestag, but it nonetheless plays a vital legislative role. The federal government must present all its legislative initiatives first to the Bundesrat; only thereafter can a proposal be passed to the Bundestag.

Further, the Bundesrat must approve all legislation affecting policy areas for which the Basic Law grants the Länder concurrent powers and for which the Länder must administer federal regulations. This approval (Zustimmung) requires a majority of actively used "yes" votes, so that a state coalition with a divided opinion on a bill votes—by its abstention—effectively against the bill. The Bundesrat has increased its legislative responsibilities over time by successfully arguing for a broad, rather than a narrow, interpretation of what constitutes the range of legislation affecting Land interests. In 1949, only 10% of all federal laws, namely, those directly affecting the Länder, required Bundesrat approval. In 1993 close to 60% of federal legislation required the Bundesrat's assent. The Basic Law also provides the Bundesrat with an absolute veto of such legislation.

Constitutional changes require an approval with majority of two thirds of all votes in Bundestag and Bundesrat, thus giving the Bundesrat an absolute veto against constitutional change.

Against all other legislation the Bundesrat has a suspensive veto (Einspruch), which can be overridden by passing the law again, but this time with 50% plus one vote of all Bundestag members, not just by majority of votes cast, which is frequent in daily parliamentary business. Because most legislation is passed by a coalition that has such an absolute majority in the Bundestag, this kind of suspensive veto rarely stops legislation. As an added provision, however, a law vetoed with a majority of two thirds must be passed again with a majority of two thirds in the Bundestag, more generally a Bundesrat veto can be overidden by a Bundestag vote with a greater percentage than the veto. The Einspruch has to be passed with active "no" votes, so that abstentions count as votes against the veto, i.e. to let the law pass.

If the absolute veto is used, the Bundesrat, the Bundestag, or the government can convene a joint committee to negotiate a compromise. That compromise cannot be amended and both chambers (Bundesrat and Bundestag) are required to hold a final vote on the compromise as is.
The political power of the absolute veto is particularly evident when the opposition party or parties in the Bundestag have a majority in the Bundesrat, which was the case almost constantly between 1991 and 2005. Whenever this happens, the opposition can threaten the government's legislative program. Such a division of authority can complicate the process of governing when the major parties disagree, and, unlike the Bundestag, the Bundesrat cannot be dissolved. Such stalemates are not unlike those that may be experienced under cohabitation in other countries.

Criticism

Some observers claim that the opposing majorities lead to an increase in backroom politics, where small groups of high-tier leaders make all the important decisions and the Bundestag representatives have a choice only between agreeing with them or not getting anything done at all. The German "Federalism Commission" was looking into this issue, among others. There have been frequent suggestions of replacing the Bundesrat with a US-style elected Senate, which would be elected at the same date as the Bundestag. This is hoped to increase the institution's popularity, reduce Land bureaucracy influence on legislation, make opposing majorities less likely, make the legislative process more transparent, and generally set a new standard of democratic, rather than bureaucratic leadership.

Other observers emphasize that different majorities in the two legislative bodies ensure that all legislation, when approved, has the support of a broad political spectrum, a particularly valuable attribute in the aftermath of unification, when consensus on critical policy decisions is vital. The formal representation of the states in the federal government, through the Bundesrat, provides an obvious forum for the coordination of policy between the states and the federal government. The need for such coordination, particularly given the specific, crucial needs of the eastern states, has become only more important.

Supporters of the Bundesrat claim that the Bundesrat serves as a control mechanism on the Bundestag in the sense of a system of checks and balances. Since the executive and legislative functions are closely intertwined in any parliamentary system, the Bundesrats ability to revisit and slow down legislative processes is often seen as making up for that loss of separation.

See also
 Presidium of the Bundesrat
 Federalism in Germany
 Politics of Germany
 Länderkammer
 Composition of the German State Parliaments

Notes

References

External links

Members of the Bundesrat (German Wikipedia)
A- und B-Länder (German Wikipedia)

1949 establishments in West Germany